Ctenurella (from  , 'comb' and  , 'tail') is an extinct genus of ptyctodont placoderm from the Late Devonian of Germany. The first fossils were found in the Strunde valley in the Paffrather Kalkmulde.

Description
As with other ptyctodonts, the armor of Ctenurella was reduced to a few thin plates on the head and shoulder region. It was also relatively small for a placoderm, at just  in length. Ctenurella had two dorsal fins and the rear of the body was relatively long and low. Most ptyctodonts are presumed to have fed on the ocean floor, but the well-developed fins of this genus indicate that it probably also swam in open waters.

Ctenurella had a long, whip-like tail, large eyes, and robust upper and lower jaw tooth plates. Males also had  hook-shaped sex organs, known as claspers. Since analogous features are also found in the unrelated living chimaeras, chimaeras and ptyctodonts are thought to be an example of convergent evolution.

Etymology
The specific name of the type species, C. gladbachensis, is a reference of the place Bergisch Gladbach, where it was founded.

Taxonomy and evolution
The species Ctenurella gardineri was split off into the new genus Austroptyctodus by Long (1997) in his review of the Gogo ptyctodontid species, stipulating that the genus Ctenurella as only coming from the German sites. A new description of Ctenurella gladbachensis by Long (1997) showed that the original restoration had wrongly restored the skull-roof as the central bones do not in fact meet each other behind the nuchal plate.

Ptyctodontid placoderms recently have been shown to give birth to live young, with specimens of pregnant females from two genera, Materpiscis and Austroptyctodus, both from the Gogo Formation of Western Australia, showing the presence of unborn embryos within the mother fishes (Long et al. 2008)

References

 Long, J.A. 1997. Ptyctodontid fishes (Vertebrata, Placodermi) from the Late Devonian Gogo Formation, Western Australia, with a revision of the genus Ctenurella Orvig, 1960. Geodiversitas 19 (3): 515-555.
 Long, J.A., Trinajstic, KJ., Younbg, G.C. & Senden, T. 2008. Live birth in the Devonian period. Nature 453: 650-652.

Ptyctodontids
Placoderms of Europe
Placoderm genera